The Monterrey Institute of Technology and Higher Education (in Spanish: Instituto Tecnológico y de Estudios Superiores de Monterrey, ITESM) commonly shortened as Monterrey Institute of Technology (Tecnológico de Monterrey) or Monterrey Tech (Tec de Monterrey) is one of the largest private, nonsectarian and coeducational multi-campus universities in Latin America with over 90,000 students at the high school, undergraduate, and postgraduate levels. Based in Monterrey, Mexico, the institute has 31 campuses in 25 cities throughout the country and is known for becoming the first university ever connected to the Internet in Latin America and the Spanish-speaking world, having one of the top graduate business schools in the region and being one of the leaders in patent applications among Mexican universities.

Academics
Horacio Ahuett Garza - specialist in rapid prototypes
Adrianni Zanatta Alarcón - mecatronic engineer and researcher
Mario Moises Alvarez - pharmaceutical biochemical engineer
Rosaura Barahona - professor and writer
Herminio Blanco Mendoza - economist
Betsy Boze - college administrator
René Cabral Torres - economist
Jimena Canales - historian and researcher
Mauricio De la Maza-Beningnos - conservationist, naturalist and zoologist
Ernesto Enkerlin - environmentalist
Héctor García-Molina - computer science professor and researcher
Teofilo F. González - computer scientist and professor emeritus
José Luis González Velarde - mathematics professor and researcher
Julio César Gutiérrez Vega - physicist
Jorge Ibarra Salazar - economist
Cristina Mittermeier - marine biologist, biochemical engineer
Blanca Guadalupe López Morales - literature professor
Arturo Molina Gutiérrez - Vice-president of Research, Postgraduate Studies and Continuing Education at the Tecnológico de Monterrey
Daniel Moska Arreola - business professor
Héctor Moreira Rodríguez - petrochemicals and strategy studies
Gustavo Petricioli - economist, former Ambassador to the United States
David Noel Ramírez Padilla - Rector of ITESM
Rafael Rangel Sostmann - engineer; former rector of ITESM
Marco Rito-Palomares - food and biochemical researcher
Miguel Robles-Durán - urbanist
Mireille Roccatti - researcher; first female president of Mexico's Human Rights Commission
Manuel Sánchez - economist; former deputy governor of the Bank of Mexico
Macario Schettino - economist
Eduardo Sojo Garza-Aldape - economist; former advisor to President Vicente Fox
Carlos Manuel Urzúa Macías - Director of EGAP
Lorenzo Zambrano - CEO of CEMEX

Businesspeople
Francisco Arredondo-Soberon - founder of Reproductive Medicine Associates of Texas
Alberto Bustani Adem - former president of ITESM-Monterrey
Mauricio Fernández Garza - board member of Grupo Alfa
José Antonio Fernández - CEO of FEMSA
Eugenio Garza Lagüera - Chairman of the Board of ITESM and FEMSA
Heriberto Félix Guerra - President of CANACINTRA
Gustavo Guzmán - CEO of Azteca Telecom
Javier de Lope Francés - founder of five companies before graduating college
Ernesto Martens - former president of CINTRA; former Secretary of Energy in Mexico
David Martínez Guzmán - founder and managing partner of Fintech Advisory
Francisco Javier Mayorga Castañeda - businessman and former Secretary of Agriculture
Pablo Reimers Morales - founder of Cesatoni and the ITESM Campus in Zacatecas
Luis Armando Reynoso-Founder of Inmobiliario Reynoso Femat
Alfonso Romo - agro-industrialist; founder of the Opción Ciudadana Party
Carlos Salazar Lomelín - CEO of FEMSA
Ricardo Salinas Pliego - CEO of Grupo Salinas and Grupo Elektra
Hugo Salinas Price - founder of Grupo Elektra
Blanca Treviño - founder of Softtek

Politicians
Lilia Aguilar Gil - federal deputy from Chihuahua
Flor Ayala - Mexican congresswoman from Sonora
Marco Antonio Adame - former governor of Morelos
Agustín Basave Benítez - politician and president of PRD
Roberto Borge Angulo -  Governor of Quintana Roo
Alberto Barrera Zurita - Representative to Chamber of Deputies
Sue Ellen Bernal - Representative in the Chamber of Deputies for the State of Mexico
Eduardo Bours - businessman and former governor of Sonora
Fernando Canales Clariond - former governor of Nuevo León
Javier Castelo Parada - representative from Sonora in the Chamber of Deputies
Manuel Cavazos Lerma - Mexican Senator
Arturo Chávez - attorney; former Attorney General of Mexico
Benjamín Clariond - politician from Sonora
Tatiana Clouthier - politician
Manuel Clouthier - PAN nominee for president 1988
Manuel Clouthier Carrillo - politician and representative from Sinaloa for the final four months of his term in the LXI Legislature
Luis Donaldo Colosio - presidential candidate assassinated in 1994
Gabino Cué Monteagudo - Governor of Oaxaca
Alejandra del Moral Vela - Mexican congresswoman
Ángel Alonso Díaz Caneja - Mexican senator from Puebla
Fernando Elizondo Barragán
Rodolfo Elizondo Torres - former mayor of Victoria de Durango
Eugenio Elorduy Walther - former governor of Baja California
Bernardo de la Garza - former presidential candidate of the Green Party in Mexico
Alejandro Galván Garza - federal representative from Tamaulipas
Lizbeth Gamboa Song - federal representative from Quintana Roo
Carlos Joaquín González - Governor of Quintana Roo
Juan Antonio Guajardo Anzaldúa - politician from Tamaulipas
Marcela Guerra Castillo - Senator from Nuevo León
Carlos Gutierrez - former US Secretary of Commerce
Eugenio Hernández Flores - former governor of Tamaulipas
César Jáuregui Robles - Senator from Coahuila
Jorge Luis Lavalle Maury - Mexican senator from Campeche
Ignacio Loyola Vera - Governor of Querétaro
Daniel Ludlow Kuri - Federal Deputy from Hidalgo
Gastón Luken Garza - Politician and businessman
Antonio Juan Marcos Villarreal - politician and businessman
Patricio Martínez García - former governor of Chihuahua
Enrique Martínez y Martínez - former governor of Coahuila
Carlos Medina Plascencia - former governor of Guanajuato
Héctor Murguía Lardizábal - Politician, Senator from Chihuahua
Maurilio Ochoa - Politician from Chihuahua
Rafael Pacchiano Alamán - Federal deputy from Querétaro
Enrique Peña Nieto - President of Mexico
Juan Fernando Perdomo- Federal deputy from Veracruz
Gerardo Priego Tapia - Politician and economist from Tabasco
Luis Alberto Rico - Federal deputy from Coahuila
Ernesto Ruffo Appel - former governor of Baja California, current Mexican Senador
Gabriela Ruiz del Rincón-Senator from Sinaloa
Gerardo Ruiz Mateos - former secretary of the economy of Mexico
Antonio Sánchez Díaz de Rivera- Representative from Puebla
Adolfo Toledo Infanzón - Senator from Oaxaca
Zeferino Torreblanca - former governor of Guerrero
Egidio Torre Cantú- Governor of Tamaulipas
Antonio Valladolid Rodríguez - Federal deputy from Baja California
Romeo Vásquez Velásquez - Politician and brigadier general in Honduras the military of Honduras from January 11, 2005
Jorge Villalobos Seáñez - Federal deputy from Sinaloa
Tomás Yarrington - former governor of Tamaulipas

Sportspeople
Rolando Cantú - football player and promoter of the sport in Mexico
Cristina Ferral - football (soccer) player
Ismael Hernández - pentathlete at 2016 Olympic Games
Manuel Padilla - football player
Pablo Solares - runner

Other professionals
Araceli Ardón - Mexican writer
Hans Backoff Escudero - oenologist; co-founder of Monte Xanic winery
Rodolfo Barragán Schwarz - architect
Pedro Celis - computer engineer
Carmen Victoria Felix Chaidez - scientist; aspiring astronaut to Mars
Sigfrido Cuen - writer
Álvaro Cueva - television critic
Fernando del Rincón - Mexican television presenter
Ricardo Elizondo Elizondo - writer and librarian
José Horacio Gómez - Archbishop of Los Angeles 
Francisco Gonzalez Pulido - architect
Alejandra Lagunes - press secretary to Mexican presidency
Rajiv Makhni - journalist
Roberto Javier Mora García - journalist assassinated in 2004
Luis Pazos - lawyer and author
Ciro Procuna - Sports announcer
Daniel Alonso Rodriguez - Human rights speaker and politician
Karen Villeda - Mexican writer
Gabriel Zaid - writer
Miguel Elizalde - Executive President of ANPACT

Notes

References

Monterrey Institute of Technology and Higher Education alumni